Didier Lebri (born 28 December 1988) is an Ivorian football striker who currently plays for Shire Endaselassie.

References

1988 births
Living people
Ivorian footballers
US Ouakam players
Jendouba Sport players
AS Marsa players
Espérance Sportive de Tunis players
CS Sfaxien players
FC Monthey players
CS Hammam-Lif players
Al-Merrikh SC players
Bloemfontein Celtic F.C. players
Jimma Aba Jifar F.C. players
Association football forwards
Tunisian Ligue Professionnelle 1 players
Ivorian expatriate footballers
Expatriate footballers in Senegal
Ivorian expatriate sportspeople in Senegal
Expatriate footballers in Tunisia
Ivorian expatriate sportspeople in Tunisia
Expatriate footballers in Switzerland
Ivorian expatriate sportspeople in Switzerland
Expatriate footballers in Sudan
Ivorian expatriate sportspeople in Sudan
Expatriate soccer players in South Africa
Ivorian expatriate sportspeople in South Africa
Expatriate footballers in Ethiopia
Ivorian expatriate sportspeople in Ethiopia
Ethiopian Premier League players